St Giles' Church, Norwich is a Grade I listed parish church in the Church of England in Norwich.

History

The church is medieval and is noted in the Domesday Book of 1086. The present St Giles Church has its origins in 1386, when a bequest was given to start building the church. By 1424, the tower was almost finished, and by 1430 the building was complete enough for funerals to take place. It was restored between 1866 and 1867 by Richard Phipson. The tower is the tallest in Norwich at a height of 120 ft.

Memorials

There are a number of wall monuments including those to:
Thomas Churchman 1742 by Sir Henry Cheere, 1st Baronet
Sir Thomas Churchman 1781 by Thomas Rawlins
Philip Stannard 1747 by Thomas Rawlins

Organ

The church contained an organ which dated from 1896 by Norman and Beard. A specification of the organ can be found on the National Pipe Organ Register.

References

Giles
Norwich